Ruby Skye was a former popular nightclub located at 420 Mason Street in the Tenderloin neighborhood of San Francisco, California, in operation from 1990 to 2017.

Building history 

The nightclub was housed in the Native Sons of the Golden West building at 420 Mason Street, built in 1912 by architect August Headman. The nightclub was housed in what was originally an auditorium/meeting hall. In the 1940s it became a USO club and was called the "Stage Door." Later it started showing films as the "Stage Door Theater" and hosted the premiere of the Alfred Hitchcock film Vertigo on May 9, 1958. By the early 1980s, it had become the Regency III movie theater (the Regency I and II were located several blocks away).

In 1989 the theater was renamed the "Stage Door Theater" while it was used as a temporary home for the ACT theater. ACT's Geary Theater was heavily damaged in the 1989 earthquake and was being restored.

Club history 
According to FOH Online, Ruby Skye's sound system consisted of a five-way EAW Avalon DC1 system that had been modified by JK Sound to use EAW KF series drivers. The system included eight EAW DC1 three-way cabinets, six DCT2 supertweeter arrays and 20 DCS2 subwoofers capable of 140db of bass energy. It was the first nightclub in the world to implement Lake Contour 26 loudspeaker processors for audio management.

Ruby Skye  played host to a long list of world-renowned DJs, including Above & Beyond, Afrojack, Armin van Buuren, BT, Darude, Deep Dish, John Digweed, Kaskade, Mark Farina, Markus Schulz, Paul Oakenfold, Paul van Dyk, Pete Tong, Roger Sanchez, Sasha, and Tiësto.

It was also a popular location for some of the 106 KMEL House of Soul concerts that the radio station KMEL hosts from time to time.

Closure 
On March 16, 2017, Ruby Skye announced it would be closing within two months or so after 17 years as a mostly EDM venue.  The final event at Ruby Skye took place on Saturday, June 10, 2017, and featured DJ Chuckie with a set called Last Call with Chuckie.

A new music venue called August Hall, was opened by new owner Nate Valentine at the same location and would feature a restaurant and a few lanes for bowling on the lower level.

References

External links
Ruby Skye website 

Music venues in San Francisco
Nightclubs in San Francisco
Theatres in San Francisco
Tenderloin, San Francisco
Defunct nightclubs in California